Balana is a village in Sri Lanka. It is located within the Kandy District, Central Province.

It is situated in the Alagalla Mountain Range near the boundaries of the Central and Sabaragamuwa Provinces. The Alagalla mountains served as a natural defence location for nearly five centuries. It is the site of the Balana fort, a strategic rock fortress and an outpost to Kandyan kingdom, built between the Kadugannawa Pass and the Alagalla Mountain Range.

It is serviced by the Balana railway station, which is on the Main line.

See also
List of towns in Central Province, Sri Lanka

External links

Populated places in Kandy District
Geography of Kandy District